Brooke Marie Bennett (born May 6, 1980) is an American former competition swimmer and three-time Olympic champion.

Swimming career

1996 Summer Olympics

Bennett's first gold medal came in the 800-meter freestyle race at the 1996 Summer Olympics in Atlanta, Georgia. This accomplishment, coming days after her grandfather died, was overshadowed by the fact that this was the last Olympic race in the career of swimming legend Janet Evans.

1998 World Aquatics Championships

A new rival emerged for Bennett in the 800-meter freestyle, teammate Diane Munz who had beaten her in two separate races the past couple years.  However, Bennett led from the start and held off Munz's late finishing charge to win the 800-meter freestyle gold.  She also led the 400-meter freestyle most of the way, but was passed at the end by a swimmer of the controversial Chinese women's team, finishing with silver.

2000 Summer Olympics

At the 2000 Summer Olympics Brooke hit the peak of her swimming career.  She won two more gold medals in the 400- and 800-meter freestyle races, with the latter coming in Olympic record time. In the 400-meter freestyle she defeated a strong field that included her teammate Diana Munz who had beaten her at the U.S. Olympic trials, the 1996 Olympic 200 freestyle champion Claudia Poll, and that year's fastest performer, Hannah Stockbauer.  Bennett's time was the fastest in the event in nine years.

In the 800-meter freestyle Bennett again faced formidable competition from 200- and 400-meter medley Olympic winner Yana Klochkova, and Kaitlin Sandeno who had pulled a major upset in denying Diana Munz a place in the 800-meter freestyle at the U.S. Olympic trials.  Bennett led from the start, swam an aggressive and steady race, and won commandingly in the fastest 800-meter freestyle time in 10 years.

Post 2000 Olympics

Her attempt for a third straight Olympic appearance fell short in 2004, following operations on both of her shoulders in 2001.  She finished third in the 800-meter freestyle (with only the top two finishers qualify for the Olympic Team).  The Tampa Tribune reported in December 2005 that Bennett was planning an Olympic comeback in 2008, but her bid for a 3rd Olympics came up short.

See also

 List of multiple Olympic gold medalists
 List of Olympic medalists in swimming (women)
 List of World Aquatics Championships medalists in swimming (women)

References

External links
  Brooke Bennett – Official biography at PMGSports.com
 
 

1980 births
Living people
American female freestyle swimmers
Medalists at the FINA World Swimming Championships (25 m)
Olympic gold medalists for the United States in swimming
Sportspeople from Tampa, Florida
Swimmers at the 1995 Pan American Games
Swimmers at the 1996 Summer Olympics
Swimmers at the 2000 Summer Olympics
World Aquatics Championships medalists in swimming
Medalists at the 2000 Summer Olympics
Medalists at the 1996 Summer Olympics
Pan American Games gold medalists for the United States
Pan American Games medalists in swimming
Medalists at the 1995 Pan American Games
Durant High School (Florida) alumni
21st-century American women